SCFE may refer to:
 Slipped capital femoral epiphysis
 South Central Florida Express, Inc.